Garshom Awards were instituted by Garshom Foundation, Bangalore India and initiated in the year 2002. The word "Garshom" means "Pravasi", one who is away from his motherland. Garshom Awards were instituted to recognize those hidden faces among the community of Non Resident Keralites who have been doing laudable work in the socio-cultural-business-professional field in various parts of the world. The awards recognize the contribution of the global community of NRKs to the society they are currently part of, the nation they were born to, and to Kerala, their motherland in particular.

The 17 Garshom Award presentation ceremonies have been held in Bangalore 2003, 2004, 2010, New Delhi 2005, Trivandrum 2006, Hyderabad 2007, Chennai 2009, Kuwait 2011, Kuala Lumpur, Malaysia 2012, Bangalore 2015, Malacca, Malaysia 2016, Atlantis, The Palm, Dubai 2017, Tokyo, Japan 2018, Oslo Norway 2019,Panaji Goa. and Baku Azerbaijan

17th Garshom Awards

Garshom International Awards 2022 were presented at The Landmark Hotel, Baku Azerbaijan on 22 November 2022.  Indian Embassy in Baku Ambassador-in-Charge Mr Vinay Kumar given away the 17th Garshom International Awards. Azerbaijan Parliament Member Razi Nurullayev, Croatia Ambassador Mr Branko Zebic, Bengaluru North University Syndicate Member Mr Jaijo Joseph and former Karnataka MLA Mr Ivan Nigli are special guests.

16th Garshom Awards

Garshom International Awards 2021 presentation ceremony was held at Hyatt Regency Baku, Azerbaijan on 20 November 2022. Morocco Ambassador Mr Mohammad Adil Embarch given away the awards. Indian Embassy in Baku Ambassador-in-Charge Mr Vinay Kumar, Bengaluru North University Syndicate Member Mr Jaijo Joseph and former Karnataka MLA Mr Ivan Nigli are participated as special guests.

15th Garshom Awards

The Hon'ble Governor of Goa Mr. P S Sreedharan Pillai presented the 15th Garshom International Awards at Fortune Miramar ITC Hotel, Panaji in Goa on September 17, 2022, in the presence of Mr. Mauvin Godinho, Minister for Industries, Transport, Panchayat and Protocol, Govt. of Goa, Mr. Krishna V Salkar MLA, chairman, South Goa Planning and Development Authority, Mr. Jaijo Joseph, Syndicate Member, Bangalore North University and Mr. Jins Paul, President, Garshom Foundation.

14th Garshom Awards

The Garshom International Awards 2019 were presented in a function held at Hotel Scandic Solli, Oslo in Norway on 24 August 2019. Norway Notodden City Mayor Gry Fuglestveit Bløchlinger and Norway Parliament member Mr. Himanshu Gulati distributed the awards to the winners in the presence of Mr. Amar Jeet, director of cultural wing with the Indian Embassy in Norway, the award committee chairman and Karnataka ex-MLA Mr. Ivan Nigli, former Garshom awardee Mr. P K Abdulla Koya, Dr. Bindu Sara Varghese, President, Norwegian Malayali Association, Mr. Jostein Meen, Mr. Jaijo Joseph, executive director, Garshom Infomedia Limited and Mr. Jins Paul, President, Garshom Foundation.

13th Garshom Awards

The 13th Garshom International Awards presentation ceremony was held at Tokyo Bay Tokyu Hotel, Tokyo, Japan on 13 October 2018. The awards were presented by Nakamura Rikako, Member of Parliament, Japan in the presence of Tom Joseph, Councillor, Whittlesea, Australia; Shigeki Someya, former MLA, Sakae-cho, Japan; Siddharth Singh, Director, Cultural Centre, Indian Embassy, Tokyo; Tadashi Awazu, President, Taiyotomah Co. Ltd., Osaka, Japan; Tetsuyuki Toyama, founder of Yamahachi Chemical Co. Ltd.,  Aichi, Japan; Jolly Thadathil, Germany; Suresh Lal, founding member, Nihonkairali, Japan; and Joseph Scaria, Asia Pacific Director, Habitat for Humanity International.

12th Garshom Awards

The 12th Garshom International Awards presentation ceremony was held at Atlantis The Palm, Dubai, UAE on 1 December 2017. The awards were presented by Brigadier H. E Mohammed Ahmed Al Yammahi, Federal National Council Member, UAE; Sri. V Vaithilingam, Hon'ble Speaker, Puducheri Legislative Assembly; and Sri. U T Khader,  Minister for Food & Civil Supplies, Govt. of Karnataka. Guests of honour were Sri. Thumbay Moideen, Chairman of Thumbay Group, UAE; Sri. Joseph Scaria, Asia Pacific Director, Habitat for Humanity International; Dr. Francis Cleetus and Sri. Ivan Nigli, former MLA, Karnataka.

11th Garshom Awards

The 11th Garshom international awards were presented at Cultural Center (Panggung Seri), Taman Budaya, Malacca, Malaysia on 17 December 2016. The Hon'ble Deputy Chief Minister, Govt. of Malacca, Malaysia, Md. Yunos Husin inaugurated the presentation ceremony. The Hon'ble Minister for Human Resource Development, Govt. of Malacca, Malaysia, Datuk M. S. Mahadevan presented the awards. All Malaysia Malayalee Association president Datuk Suseela Menon, Program Organizing Committee Chairman Dr. N R Nambiar, Tan Sri Raveendran Menon, Garshom Awards 2016 Jury chairman Sri. Joseph Scaria Junior, Garshom Foundation Secretary Sri. Jins Paul, Garshom Infomedia Ltd. Executive Director Sri. Jaijo Joseph and Malacca Kerala Samajam president Dr. Jayasankar felicitated the awardees.

10th Garshom Awards

The tenth Garshom Awards were presented by the Bangalore Development and Town Planning Minister Sri. K. J. George. At the presentation ceremony held in the Garden City College Ceremony Hall on Sunday 27 December 2015, the press secretary to the Indian President Sri. Venu Rajamony, Dr. Aswath Narayan MLA, Honorary Consul of Maldives Dr. Joseph V.G, and Dr. J. Alexander were the chief guests. The award for the Garshom Best Malayalee Association was given to All India Malayalee Association (AIMA), Chennai, and was received by its President Sri. Gokulam Gopalan and Chairman Sri. Babu Panikker. Former MLA Sri. Ivan Nigli, Managing Editor of Garshom Sri. Jins Paul and executive director of Garshom Sri. Jaijo Joseph also addressed the gathering.

9th Garshom Awards

The Hon. Minister of Prime Minister's Department, Govt. of Malaysia Datuk Seri G.Palanivel presented the 9th Garshom Awards at the Batu Caves Community Hall, Kuala Lumpur, Malaysia on 21 October 2012. The Hon. Deputy Minister of Information, Communication & Culture, Govt. of Malaysia Datuk Maglin Dennis D'Cruz; Tan Sri. Datuk K.Ravindran Menon, President AMMA Malaysia; Ajay Tharayil, KPCC General Secretary; Garshom Infomedia Ltd. Managing Editor Jins Paul; Executive Director Jaijo Joseph; Datuk S. Nadarajah; Datuk A.Vaithilingam; Saras Nair; and Dr. N.R. Nambiar felicitated the awardees.

8th Garshom Awards

The 8th Garshom awards were presented by the former Rajyasabha deputy chairperson Dr. Najma Heptulla. At the presentation ceremony held in the Indian Community school, Salmiya, Kuwait on Friday 27 May 2011, the acting Indian Ambassador Vidhu P Nair, Gen. Secy of Samajwadi Party Rajeev Rai were the chief guests. The chairman of the jury of the 8th Garshom awards Sri. Ivan Nigli, Managing Editor of Garshom Sri. Jins Paul, Sri. Jolly Joseph n=com_content&view=article&id=371</ref>.

7th Garshom Awards

The Hon. Home Minister, Govt. of Karnataka, Dr. V. S. Acharya inaugurated the 7th Garshom Awards programme at the NIMHANS Convention Centre, Bangalore on 20 February 2010. The Hon. Minister for Law & Justice, Govt. of India, Veerappa Moily presented the awards. Oommen Chandi, Opposition Leader, Govt. of Kerala; NA Haris MLA, Jayakar Reddy MLA; Sambaki MLA from Karnataka Benny Behnan; Garshom Awards Jury chairman Sri. Ivan Nigli; Garshom Infomedia Ltd. Managing Editor Sri. Jins Paul; Executive Director Sri. Jaijo Joseph; and 2008 Garshom Yuva Pravasi award winner Reji Kumar felicitated the awardees.

6th Garshom Awards 

The awards were presented by Dr. MM Rajendran, former Governor of Orissa on 31 January 2009 at Hotel Courtyard by Marriott, Chennai. Dr. Oscar Nigli MLA; M S Viswanathan, music director; Dr. TP Sreenivasan, former Ambassador to Austria; Dr. Parateep Philip IPS, IG of Police, Chennai; and Dr. Saji D'Zousa were present . The award committee consisting of K. Sukumaran (Retd. Chief General Manager, S.B.T.), Ivan Nigli (ex. Karnataka MLA), Dr. B. Ashok Kumar, Polly Mathew Somatheeram, S.K. Nair (Administrator, Garden City College, Bangalore), and Jins Paul (Managing Editor, Garshom Infomedia Ltd) selected the winners.

5th Garshom Awards 

The 5th Garshom Awards were presented at Harihara Kalabhavan, Hyderabad, Andrapradesh on 29 December 2007 in a function graced by Sri. Madhu, senior cine artist and Sri Jagathi Sreekumar, cine artist.

4th Garshom Awards 

The 4th Garshom Awards were presented by M V Rajasekharan, Minister of state for Planning, Govt. of India in a programme held at Somatheeram Health Resorts, Kovalam on 17 December 2006. Guests included T U Kuruvilla, PWD minister, Govt. of Keral;, Ivan Nigli, MLA from Karnataka; George Mercian, MLA from Kerala; Madhu, senior cine artist; and Baby Mathew Arambankudi, MD, Jeevan TV.

3rd Garshom Awards 

Oscar Fernandes, Hon. Minister for NRIs, Govt. of India, presented the Garshom Awards in a function held at The Park, New Delhi on 9 December 2005. The other dignitaries who graced the occasion were Babu Diwakaran, Labour minister, Govt. of Kerala; and Ivan Nigli, MLA from Karnataka.

2nd Garshom Awards 

The Hon. Chief Minister, Govt. of Karnataka N. Dharam Singh presented the Garshom Awards in a well attended function held at St. John's Medical College Auditorium, Bangalore on 12 December 2004. Guests included Ivan Nigli, MLA from Karnataka, K J George, Karnataka PCC Gen. Secretary; and Mukesh, cine actor. A dance show was performed by artistes of Chitra School of Performing Arts, Bangalore.

1st Garshom Award 

The first Garshom Award was presented to Dr. Polly Mathew from Germany in a colourful function held at the Chowdaiah Memorial Hall, Bangalore by J. Alexander, MLA, Govt. of Karnataka on 27 July 2003. The other guests present were K. B. Ganesh Kumar, MLA from Kerala; Madhu, senior cine actor and Mr. Jins Paul, founder, Garshom.

References

External links
 
 

Indian awards
Awards established in 2002
Indian diaspora in Japan
Indian diaspora in Europe
Kerala diaspora
Garshom Awardees